Mark M. Malone (born November 22, 1958) is an American former football quarterback in the National Football League (NFL).

Playing career

Malone was the nation's most recruited quarterback in 1975 out of El Cajon Valley High School near San Diego, California. He also was recruited by the USOC as a possible decathlete for the 1980 Olympics.

He was a two-year starter at Arizona State University and was chosen by the Pittsburgh Steelers with the 28th pick in the 1980 NFL draft. While in college, he proved to be an adept runner as much as he was a passer.

1977 (11 Games): 14/26 for 197 yards with 2 TD vs. 1 INT.  27 carries for 168 yards.
1978 (11 Games): 93/205 for 1,305 yards with 11 TD vs. 15 INT.  143 carries for 705 yards with 9 TD.
1979 (11 Games): 148/289 for 1,886 yards with 10 TD vs. 12 INT.  132 carries for 471 yards with 12 TD.

NFL career 
He played eight seasons (1980–1987) with the Steelers, becoming the fourth-ranked quarterback in franchise history at the time with 8,582 yards. His highlights with the Steelers included giving the eventual Super Bowl Champion 49ers its only loss in 1984, and guiding the Steelers to the 1984 AFC Championship Game against the Miami Dolphins. He was traded on April 12, 1988, to the San Diego Chargers for his last, full NFL season. He would play one more game in 1989 with the New York Jets. For his career Malone passed for 10,175 yards and 60 TDs, and rushed 159 times for 628 yards and 18 TDs. Malone also had one career reception for a 90-yard TD against the Seattle Seahawks, a Steelers team record until Mike Wallace broke it with a 95-yard touchdown reception vs. the Arizona Cardinals in 2011. (JuJu Smith-Schuster currently holds the record with a 97-yard touchdown catch against the Detroit Lions in 2017.) Malone's career, however, was plagued with several severe injuries.

A September 1987 Sports Illustrated article on Malone recounted the knee injury he suffered against Seattle while playing wide receiver that forced him to miss the entire 1982 season after having surgery.  Malone started only half the season in 1985 for Pittsburgh due to various injuries, and missed two games at mid-season in 1986 with a thumb injury on his throwing hand.

Among his more memorable games in the NFL include becoming the first quarterback in Steeler history to complete over 80% of his passes (minimum 20 attempts) in a game vs. San Diego on November 25, 1984 (18 completions in 22 attempts, 253 yards, 4 touchdowns, 1 interception); won AFC Offensive Player of the Week for his opening day 1985 performance vs. Indianapolis (21 completions in 30 attempts for 287 yards, 5 touchdowns passing, 1 rushing) that included tying Hall of Famer Terry Bradshaw's team record for single game touchdown passes; passed for a career-high 374 yards on 26 completions with three touchdowns vs. Cincinnati on September 30, 1985; was the starting quarterback when Pittsburgh became the first visiting team to beat the Denver Broncos in the post season, leading the Steelers to a come from behind 24–17 victory in the 1984 AFC Divisional Game on December 30, 1984 (overcame two early fumbles to complete 17 of 28 passes for 228 yards and threw the game-tying touchdown pass to Louis Lipps); earned the final victory of his career as a starting quarterback against Pittsburgh, completing 17 of 24 passes, throwing a touchdown and scoring 1 rushing to lead San Diego to a 20–14 win over Pittsburgh on December 11, 1988; set a Steeler post season record (since eclipsed by Neil O'Donnell and Tommy Maddox) for single-game passing-yards for his 336-yard performance vs. Miami in the 1984 AFC Championship Game (completed 20 of 36 passes; threw 3 touchdowns and 3 interceptions).

Sportscasting career
After his playing career ended, Malone became a television sportscaster, working at WPXI in Pittsburgh and ESPN, where he was a host and analyst on the programs NFL Matchup, NFL Live and NFL 2night. He became a four-time Emmy Award Winner as the sports director at WBBM-TV in Chicago from 2004 until 2008, when his contract was not renewed (amongst others at the station) in an effort to cut costs. Malone then moved to Westwood One as a color commentator for its NFL coverage. Since April 1, 2013, Mark has co-hosted a radio talk show broadcast by NBC Sports Radio with former NFL quarterback Donovan McNabb. Under Center with Mark Malone has since relaunched with a new time slot, now on the air from 7-10p ET.

In 2019, Malone started work in the Alliance of American Football for TNT as a play-by-play announcer.

References

External links
 Pro-Football-Reference.com statistics

American football quarterbacks
Arizona State Sun Devils football players
New York Jets players
Pittsburgh Steelers players
San Diego Chargers players
Television anchors from Chicago
National Football League announcers
American television sports announcers
American television sports anchors
Living people
College football announcers
Alliance of American Football announcers
1958 births